Coster is a Dutch occupational surname. Notable people with the surname include:

 Anne Vallayer-Coster (1744–1818), French painter
 Arnold Coster (born 1976), Dutch mountaineers
 Charles Coster (1837–1888), American soldier and public official
 Charles De Coster (1827–1879), Belgian novelist
 Dick Coster (born 1946), Dutch sailor, father of Sven and Kalle Coster
 Dirk Coster (1889–1950), Dutch physicist 
 Coster–Kronig transition named after him
 Elizabeth Coster (born 1982), New Zealand swimmer
 Francis Coster (1532–1619), Flemish Jesuit theologian
 Herman Coster (1865–1899), Dutch lawyer and soldier
 Howard Coster (1885–1959), British photographer
 Janet Coster, English operatic mezzo-soprano
 John Coster (1838–1886), New Zealand politician
 Kalle Coster (born 1982), Dutch sailor, son of Dick Coster
 Keith Coster (1920–2012), South African army officer
 Laurens Janszoon Coster (c. 1370–c. 1440), Dutch printer
 Moses Elias Coster (c.1791–1848), Dutch diamond cutter
 Nick Coster (born 1985), Dutch footballer
 Nicolas Coster (born 1934), British-born American actor
 Ritchie Coster (born 1967), English actor
 Salomon Coster (c. 1620–1659), Dutch clockmaker
 Samuel Coster (1579–1665), Dutch playwright
 Stan Coster (1930–1997), Australian country musician
 Sven Coster (born 1978), Dutch sailor, son of Dick Coster
 Tom Coster (born 1941), American musician, father of Tommy
 Tommy Coster (born 1966), American keyboardist and composer, son of Tom
 Tracy Coster (born 1966), Australian country music singer
 Willem Jacobszoon Coster (1590–1640), Dutch Governor of Ceylon

Coster-Waldau
 Nikolaj Coster-Waldau (born 1970), Danish actor
 Nukaaka Coster-Waldau (born 1971), Greenlandic singer, actress, and model

See also
 Koster (surname)
 De Coster

Dutch-language surnames
Occupational surnames